Kuli Darreh (also Romanized as Kūlī Darreh; also known as Gavī Darreh and Kūlardeh) is a village in Vargahan Rural District, in the Central District of Ahar County, East Azerbaijan Province, Iran. At the 2006 census, its population was 73, in 18 families.

References 

Populated places in Ahar County